Cindy Bortz-Gould is an American former figure skater. She is the 1987 World Junior Figure Skating champion.

Biography
Bortz was born and raised in Tarzana, California, and is Jewish. She began skating at eight years old, and entered her first competition a year later. In 1985 she came in second in the Novice Level at the 1985 U.S. Figure Skating Championships.

At age 14, 4-foot-8-inches tall and weighing 80 pounds, Bortz won the Junior Ladies gold medal at the 1986 U.S. National Figure Skating Championships, beating silver medalist Susanne Becher of West Germany. During the competition she became the first junior woman to successfully perform the difficult Triple Lutz. She then came in second to Jill Trenary at the U.S. Olympic Sports Festival.

Bortz won the 1987 World Junior Figure Skating Championships in Kitchener, Ontario, Canada, at 15 years of age, and the 1987 Prize of Moscow.  That year Bortz was a U.S. National Team alternate.

In 1988 she won the Novarat Trophy in Budapest, Hungary, and came in seventh at the 1988 U.S. Figure Skating Championships.  In 1989, Bortz won the Prize of Moscow in Russia, and came in seventh at the 1989 U.S. Figure Skating Championships.

Bortz married in 1994. She coaches skating in Simi Valley, California.

Bortz was inducted into the Southern California Jewish Sports Hall of Fame in 2006.

Bortz-Gould appeared on TLC's show Ice Diaries in 2006, where one of her students, Danielle Kahle, was featured.

Results

See also
List of Jewish figure skaters

References

External links
 Southern California Jewish Sports Hall of Fame page
 Photo of Bortz-Gould with Kahle at the 2004 Junior Grand Prix Final

Navigation

American female single skaters
Jewish American sportspeople
Living people
World Junior Figure Skating Championships medalists
Year of birth missing (living people)
People from Tarzana, Los Angeles
21st-century American Jews
21st-century American women